Ultrastenos is an extinct genus of Australian mekosuchine crocodilian first described in 2016. The type species Ultrastenos willisi was discovered at Riversleigh in northwestern Queensland, Australia, and lived during the Late Oligocene era.

Discovery and naming
Ultrastenos was described in 2016  based on the holotype specimen QM F42665, a posterior cranium and mandible found at the Low Lion Site of the Riversleigh World Heritage Area. While Riversleigh is known to have been home to a variety of other mekosuchine genera, the discovery of Ultrastenos represented a previously unknown morphology of the native Oligocene to Miocene crocodilian fauna. The paratype material includes further material of the postcranial skeleton, namely a left atlantal neural arch, atlantal intercentrum, a caudal vertebrae series and dorsal osteoderms, metatarsals, a right coracoid and a right tibia. Posterior cranial material from the White Hunter Site has also been referred to Ultrastenos.

The name derives from the Latin "ultra" for extreme and the Greek "stenos" for narrow, chosen to reflect the morphology of the animal's mandible. The species epithet "willisi" honors Dr. Paul Willis for his contribution to Australian paleontology and specifically his research on members of Mekosuchinae.

Description
Ultrastenos is defined by a prominent tear-shaped supratemporal fenestra, anteroposteriorly short jugal, weakly developed paroccipital process and a shallow mandibular profile with strong anterior curvature.

The mandible of Ultrastenos is gracile in proportion with a strong curvature in dorsal view and a low lateral profile. Two ridges extend along the surangular, one on its ventral and one on its dorsal margin, enclosing the sculpted lateral surface of the bone. The ventral ridge is the more pronounced of the two, forming a ventral buttress to the mandible. The ornamentation consists of closely packed deep pitting and the mandibular fenestra is small. In dorsal view the mandible strongly constricts towards its anterior end, with the bone transitioning from a convex to a concave form. In lateral view the dentary is approximately as tall as the angular and surangular, however it grows more shallow towards the posterior margin. The toothrow is mediolaterally shallow and only the last four dentary alveoli are preserved, giving little information on the overall dentition. Two teeth are preserved with lateral carinae and weak labiolingual compression. All four alveoli are of roughly equal size. The atlantal intercentrum is tall and both it and the atlantal neural arch are anteroposteriorly elongated. The remaining vertebrae of the caudal series display similar proportions. The osteoderms forming part of the paratype stem from the dorsal shield and are moderately robust in morphology with deep pits but lacking a medial ridge. The preserved portions of the coracoid are similar to members of the genus Crocodylus but anteroposteriorly elongated with the proximal head forming an acute triangle. The tibia also resembles Crocodylus species but with marked anteroposterior flattening and a squaring of the distal diaphysis.

All material gathered at the Low Lion Site is interpreted to have belonged to a single individual that is set apart from all other crocodilians of the Oligocene to Miocene Riversleigh fauna by the distinctive constriction of the mandible. The skull material indicates a relatively small bodied animal similar in size to the extant Freshwater crocodile and notably larger than the known mekosuchine dwarf forms such as Trilophosuchus and Mekosuchus. The cranium is approximately 16 to 18 cm wide between the lateral margins of the quadrates, however there is no indication that the holotype specimen was a mature individual. The mandible could have either been truncated just anterior to the end of the preserved bone or narrowed further towards the midline, potentially meeting an elongated mandibular symphysis, however preservation does not allow for a certain answer. Since an elongated mandibular symphysis is the defining trait of a longirostrine morphology, this skull shape can only be assigned to Ultrastenos tentavively. However the mandible still shares a number of characters seen in extant longirostrine taxa such as the low mandibular profile also seen in gharials, Tomistoma, Mecistops and Freshwater crocodiles. In these animals a shallow rostrum serves to streamline the skull for rapid rostral movement against the water column. Homodonty is another trait associated with a longirostrine morphology, however the presence of only four dentary alveoli does not allow for a certain attribution of this trait to Ultrastenos.

Phylogeny
Stein et al. recovered Ultrastenos as a mekosuchine crocodilian and sister taxa to Trilophosuchus rackhami with which it shares a vertical exoccipital. Based on prior phylogenetic analysis this would suggest placement within Mekosuchini, however in Stein et al.s analysis Mekosuchini has lost cohesion due to Trilophosuchus being recovered as basal to Kambara. This was not the result of the inclusion of Ultrastenos and instead is caused by the ambiguity of Harpacochampsa and its uncertain placement within Crocodilia, which possibly introduces noise into the phylogeny of Mekosuchinae. As recovered by Stein et al., Ultrastenos would be located at the base of the Oligocene to Miocene radiation of mekosuchines.

Paleobiology
The narrow mandible and possibly longirostrine nature of Ultrastenos suggests it inhabited a niche previously not known from Riversleigh. Typically longirostrine skulls in crocodylomorphs are associated with a piscivorous diet as seen in modern day gharials. However fish were not a prominent component of late Oligocene Riversleigh and less common than frogs, snakes and lizards, which suggests that Ultrastenos may have instead fed on such small tetrapods. This hypothesis is supported with what is known of its dentition, being suited for catching and crushing prey. Consequently the narrow mandible prevents Ultrastenos from tackling larger prey as more robust-skulled mekosuchines did.

During the Late Oligocene the Riversleigh area was predominantly covered by open forests. The presence of a longirostrine crocodilian would suggest the presence of bodies of water, at the least ephemeral billabong as those inhabited by modern freshwater crocodiles. Previous studies on the Riversleigh area have argued against the presence of substantial wetlands or riversystems, with no evidence of fluviatile environments. Due to this it is more likely that Ultrastenos inhabited forest lakes and ponds that were internally drained via the karstic limestone beneath them. During the Oligocene to Miocene this part of Australia was inhabited by an ecologically diverse array of mekosuchines including two platyrostral species of Baru, three altirostral species belonging to Mekosuchus and Trilophosuchus as well as the ziphodont Quinkana.

References

Mekosuchinae
Oligocene crocodylomorphs
Riversleigh fauna
Cenozoic reptiles of Australia
Crocodiles of Australia
Prehistoric pseudosuchian genera
Fossil taxa described in 2016